A seniūnija (in English: eldership, elderate, ward, parish, or subdistrict) is the smallest  administrative division of Lithuania. An eldership may comprise  a very small region consisting of few villages, one single town, or a part of a big city. Elderships vary in size and population depending on their location and nature.

Elderships manage small-scale local matters, such as repairing pavements and dirt roads, and keep records on all families living in the eldership. The premise of the concept is that - unlike in higher administrative divisions - an elder (the leader of the eldership) could have time to talk to every person in the eldership who wants to.

Modern Lithuania is divided into 10 counties, 60 municipalities, and 546 elderships. Elderships function as municipal districts. In cities, an elder is elected to each eldership district, along with a mayor for the city.

In the Grand Duchy of Lithuania, the term referred to significantly larger administrative units, such as the Eldership of Samogitia, the name of the Duchy of Samogitia during 1422-1441.

List

See also

 Terms
 Ward
 Parish
 Subdistrict
 Lithuania
 Administrative divisions of Lithuania
 Counties (Lithuanian: singular – apskritis, plural – apskritys)
 Municipalities (Lithuanian: plural – savivaldybės, singular – savivaldybė)
 Seniūnaitija (sub-eldership)
 Cities (Lithuanian: plural – miestai, singular – miestas)
 Towns (Lithuanian: plural – miesteliai, singular – miestelis)

References

 
Subdivisions of Lithuania
Lithuania 3
Elderships, Lithuania